HABITAT 67, or simply Habitat, is a housing complex at Cité du Havre, on the Saint Lawrence River, Montreal, Quebec, Canada, designed by Israeli-Canadian architect Moshe Safdie. It originated in his master's thesis at the School of Architecture at McGill University and then an amended version was built for Expo 67, a World's Fair held from April to October 1967. Its address is 2600 Avenue Pierre-Dupuy, next to the Marc-Drouin Quay. Habitat 67 is considered an architectural landmark and a recognized building in Montreal.

History

Safdie's design for Habitat 67 began as a thesis project for his architecture program at McGill University. It was "highly recognized" at the institution, though Safdie cites its failure to win the Pilkington Prize, an award for the best thesis at Canadian schools of architecture, as early evidence of its controversial nature. After leaving to work with Louis Kahn in Philadelphia, Safdie was approached by Sandy van Ginkel, his former thesis advisor, to develop the master plan for Expo 67, the world's fair that was set to take place in Montreal during 1967. Safdie decided to propose his thesis as one of the pavilions and began developing his plan. After the plans were approved in Ottawa by Mitchell Sharp, the federal cabinet minister responsible for the exhibition, and Prime Minister Lester B. Pearson, Safdie was given the blessing of the Expo 67 Director of Installations, Edward Churchill, to leave the planning committee in order to work on the building project as an independent architect. The construction was done by Anglin-Norcross Ltd. of Montréal. Safdie was awarded the project in spite of his relative youth and inexperience, an opportunity he later described as "a fairy tale, an amazing fairy tale."

The development (about CA$22.4 million) was financed by the federal government, but is now owned by its tenants, who formed a limited partnership that purchased the building from the Canada Mortgage and Housing Corporation in 1985.

Safdie now owns Blake Gopniks childhood penthouse apartment (units 1011 and 1012) as his Montreal pied-a-terre.

Concept and design 
Habitat 67 comprises 354 identical, prefabricated concrete forms arranged in various combinations, divided into three pyramids, reaching up to 12 residential storeys, with a parking level, and a building services level. Together these units created 146 residences of varying sizes and configurations, each formed from one to eight linked concrete units. The complex originally contained 158 apartments, but several apartments have since been joined to create larger units, reducing the total number. The apartments each had a moulded plastic bathroom and a modular kitchen.

The development was designed to integrate the benefits of suburban homes—namely gardens, fresh air, privacy, and multilevelled environments—with the economics and density of a modern urban apartment building. It was believed to illustrate the new lifestyle people would live in increasingly crowded cities around the world. Safdie's goal for the project to be affordable housing largely failed: demand for the building's units has made them more expensive than originally envisioned. In addition, the existing structure was originally meant to only be the first phase of a much larger complex, but the high per-unit cost of approximately $140,000 ($22,120,000 for all 158) prevented that possibility.

The structural engineer for the project was August Eduard Komendant, an Estonian-American structural engineer and a pioneer in the field of prestressed concrete.

The theme of Expo 67 was "Man and His World", taken from Antoine de Saint-Exupéry's memoir  (literally, 'world of man', though it was published under the title Wind, Sand and Stars). Housing was also one of the main themes of Expo 67. Habitat 67 then became a thematic pavilion visited by thousands of visitors who came from around the world, and during the expo also served as the temporary residence of the many dignitaries visiting Montreal.

In March 2012, Habitat 67 won an online Lego Architecture poll and is a candidate to be added to the list of famous buildings that inspire a special replica Lego set. Lego bricks were actually used in the initial planning for Habitat; according to Safdie's firm, "initial models of the project were built using Lego bricks and subsequent iterations were also built with Lego bricks".

"There’s no transit access (residents have a private shuttle that takes them downtown) and no easy way to get there by foot."

Legacy

In 2017, Canada Post issued a commemorative stamp for the 50th anniversary of Expo 67 featuring the structure.

In 2017, from June 1 through August 13, Habitat ’67 vers l’avenir / The Shape of Things to Come, an exhibition at Centre de Design, Université du Québec à Montréal, presented "archival images and objects from the project’s origins with conceptual drawings, and models, bringing them together with plans for unbuilt iterations".

As a symbol of Expo 67, which was attended by over 50 million people during the six months it was open, Habitat 67 gained worldwide acclaim as a "fantastic experiment" and "architectural wonder". This experiment was and is regarded as both a success and failure—it "redefined urban living" and has since become "a very successful co-op", but at the same time ultimately failed to revolutionize affordable housing or launch a wave of prefabricated, modular development as Safdie had envisioned. Despite its problems, however, Habitat's fame and success "made [Safdie's] reputation" and helped launch his career; Safdie has now designed over 75 buildings and master plans around the world. Decades after Habitat, much of Safdie's work still holds to the concepts that were so fundamental to its design, especially the themes of reimagining high-density housing and improving social integration through architecture that have become "synonymous" with his work. However, The Guardian quoted The Walrus assessment of it as a "failed dream".

In popular culture

Habitat 67 appears in the background matte painting of the Scalosian City, from the remastered episode "Wink of an Eye" from Star Trek: The Original Series.

It appears on the album cover of the 2003 album Velocity : Design : Comfort by Sweet Trip and on the cover of 2012's The North (Stars album).

It also appears on the album cover of Landslide's Drum & Bossa / Buddah, his debut single from 1999 that was released on Hospital Records.

The building's covered walkways and exterior appear in several scenes in 1977's The Disappearance, starring Donald Sutherland, where the main character shares an apartment in the building with his wife.

Panorama

Further reading
 Safdie, Moshe. “Fallacies, Nostalgia and Reality”, in Habitat (Ottawa: Central Mortgage and Housing Corporation, July–August 1961).
 Safdie, Moshe. “A Case for City Living: A Three-Dimensional Modular Building System” in Habitat (Ottawa: Central Mortgage and Housing Corporation, November–December 1961). (Safdie’s architecture school thesis)
 Safdie, Moshe. “The Master Plan: Growth, Change, and Repetition” in Habitat (Ottawa: Central Mortgage and Housing Corporation, May–June 1962).
 
 
 Habitat 67 case study - timeline - Canadian Architecture Collection
 Habitat 67 - Ville de Montréal
 
 
 SOME EXAMPLES OF MODULAR CONSTRUCTION
 Safdie, Moshe, “Habitat : A Post-mortem,” RIBA Journal, November 1967, p. 493.
 Komendant, August,  “Post-mortem on Habitat,” Progressive Architecture, March 1968, p. 138-147.
 
 
 Inderbir Singh Riar. Expo 67, or the Architecture of Late Modernity - via: The Atlantic
 Conserving the Modern in Canada - Winnipeg Architecture Foundation

See also
Architecture of Canada
Brutalism
Dyson Institute Village
Metabolism (architecture)
Structuralism (architecture)

References

External links

 Habitat 67 Official website
 Moshe Safdie and Associates Official website
 Habitat 67 - Quebec Cultural Heritage Directory, Ministry of Culture and Communications (Quebec)
 Habitat 67 - The Canadian Encyclopedia, Historica Canada
 Habitat 67: 1967 and 2015-02-14
 Habitat 67, Montreal - Getty Images
 Habitat 67 - Great Buildings .com
40+ Images of Habitat 67 - Google Maps

Brutalist architecture in Canada
Buildings and structures in Montreal
Expo 67
Heritage buildings of Quebec
Moshe Safdie buildings
Residential buildings completed in 1967
Residential condominiums in Canada
Ville-Marie, Montreal
Visionary environments
World's fair architecture in Montreal